Rossland-Trail was the name of a provincial electoral district in the Canadian province of British Columbia centred on the towns of Rossland and Trail, in the West Kootenay.  The riding first appeared in the 1924 election as the result of a redistribution of the former ridings of Greenwood and Trail, and lasted until redistribution in 1996.  The same area is now part of West Kootenay-Boundary.

For other ridings in the Kootenay region, please see Kootenay (electoral districts).

Demographics

Political geography

Notable elections

Notable MLAs

Electoral history 
Note:  Winners in each election are in bold.	

 
|Liberal
|John Hugh MacDonald
|align="right"|545 	 	
|align="right"|28.40%
|align="right"|
|align="right"|unknown

|- bgcolor="white"
!align="right" colspan=3|Total valid votes
!align="right"|1,919
!align="right"|100.00%
!align="right"|
|- bgcolor="white"
!align="right" colspan=3|Total rejected ballots
!align="right"|
!align="right"|
!align="right"|
|- bgcolor="white"
!align="right" colspan=3|Turnout
!align="right"|%
!align="right"|
!align="right"|
|} 	 

 
|Liberal
|Donald MacDonald
|align="right"|1,215 	
|align="right"|41.88%
|align="right"|
|align="right"|unknown
|- bgcolor="white"
!align="right" colspan=3|Total valid votes
!align="right"|2,901 	
!align="right"|100.00%
!align="right"|
|- bgcolor="white"
!align="right" colspan=3|Total rejected ballots
!align="right"|27
!align="right"|
!align="right"|
|- bgcolor="white"
!align="right" colspan=3|Turnout
!align="right"|%
!align="right"|
!align="right"|
|}

 
|Liberal
|Richard Ronald Burns
|align="right"|1,729 
|align="right"|43.84%
|align="right"|
|align="right"|unknown

 
|Co-operative Commonwealth Fed.t
|George William Weaver
|align="right"|901 	 	
|align="right"|22.84%
|align="right"|
|align="right"|unknown
|- bgcolor="white"
!align="right" colspan=3|Total valid votes
!align="right"|3,944
!align="right"|100.00%
!align="right"|
|- bgcolor="white"
!align="right" colspan=3|Total rejected ballots
!align="right"|38
!align="right"|
!align="right"|
|- bgcolor="white"
!align="right" colspan=3|Turnout
!align="right"|%
!align="right"|
!align="right"|
|}  	  	  	  	

 
|Liberal
|Richard Ronald Burns
|align="right"|1,877
|align="right"|46.70%
|align="right"|
|align="right"|unknown

 
|Co-operative Commonwealth Fed.
|Leo Thomas Nimsick
|align="right"|891 	 	
|align="right"|22.17%
|align="right"|
|align="right"|unknown
|- bgcolor="white"
!align="right" colspan=3|Total valid votes
!align="right"|4,019 	
!align="right"|100.00%
!align="right"|
|- bgcolor="white"
!align="right" colspan=3|Total rejected ballots
!align="right"|72
!align="right"|
!align="right"|
|- bgcolor="white"
!align="right" colspan=3|Turnout
!align="right"|%
!align="right"|
!align="right"|
|}

 
|Liberal
|Richard Ronald Burns
|align="right"|1,789 	
|align="right"|24.41%
|align="right"|
|align="right"|unknown

 
|Co-operative Commonwealth Fed.
|Herbert Wilfred Herridge
|align="right"|3,621		
|align="right"|49.40%
|align="right"|
|align="right"|unknown
 
|Labour (Party)
|Antonio Joseph (Pete) Vetere
|align="right"|37 			
|align="right"|0.50%
|align="right"|
|align="right"|unknown
|- bgcolor="white"
!align="right" colspan=3|Total valid votes
!align="right"|7,330  	
!align="right"|100.00%
!align="right"|
|- bgcolor="white"
!align="right" colspan=3|Total rejected ballots
!align="right"|54
!align="right"|
!align="right"|
|- bgcolor="white"
!align="right" colspan=3|Turnout
!align="right"|%
!align="right"|
!align="right"|
|}

 
|People's Co-operative Commonwealth Fed.
|William Cunningham
|align="right"|2,060 	
|align="right"|32.06%
|align="right"|
|align="right"|unknown
 
|Co-operative Commonwealth Fed.
|Rupert William Haggen
|align="right"|933 			
|align="right"|14.52%
|align="right"|
|align="right"|unknown
 
|Social Credit Alliance
|Horton George Layton
|align="right"|261 	 			
|align="right"|4.06%
|align="right"|
|align="right"|unknown

|- bgcolor="white"
!align="right" colspan=3|Total valid votes
!align="right"|6,425 
!align="right"|100.00%
!align="right"|
|- bgcolor="white"
!align="right" colspan=3|Total rejected ballots
!align="right"|24
!align="right"|
!align="right"|
|- bgcolor="white"
!align="right" colspan=3|Turnout
!align="right"|%
!align="right"|
!align="right"|
|}

 
|Co-operative Commonwealth Fed.
|James O'Donnell Quinn
|align="right"|4,588 	
|align="right"|43.70%
|align="right"|
|align="right"|unknown

|- bgcolor="white"
!align="right" colspan=3|Total valid votes
!align="right"|10,498 	
!align="right"|100.00%
!align="right"|
|- bgcolor="white"
!align="right" colspan=3|Total rejected ballots
!align="right"|79
!align="right"|
!align="right"|
|- bgcolor="white"
!align="right" colspan=3|Turnout
!align="right"|%
!align="right"|
!align="right"|
|}

 
|Co-operative Commonwealth Fed.
|Erling Olaf Johnson
|align="right"|2,541         
|align="right"|22.02%
|align="right"| -
|align="right"| -.- %
|align="right"|
|align="right"|unknown
 
|B.C. Social Credit League
|Robert Edward Sommers
|align="right"|3,979       	
|align="right"|34.48%
|align="right"|5,917
|align="right"|55.20%
|align="right"|
|align="right"|unknown
 
|Liberal
|Alexander Douglas Turnbull
|align="right"|3,331         	
|align="right"|28.86%
|align="right"|4,803 
|align="right"|44.80%
|align="right"|
|align="right"|unknown
 
|Conservative
|Charles Alfred Holstead White
|align="right"|1,690              	
|align="right"|14.64%
|align="right"| -
|align="right"| -.- %
|align="right"|
|align="right"|unknown
|- bgcolor="white"
!align="right" colspan=3|Total valid votes
!align="right"|11,541      
!align="right"|100.00%
!align="right"|10,720  	
!align="right"| - %
!align="right"|
|- bgcolor="white"
!align="right" colspan=3|Total rejected ballots
!align="right"|277
!align="right"|
!align="right"|
!align="right"|
!align="right"|
|- bgcolor="white"
!align="right" colspan=3|Turnout
!align="right"|%
!align="right"|
!align="right"|
|- bgcolor="white"
!align="right" colspan=7|2  Preferential ballot.  First and final counts of three shown only.
|} 	  		 

 
|Conservative
|Emil George Fletcher
|align="right"|621 	  	             	
|align="right"|5.56%
|align="right"| - 
|align="right"| -.- %
|align="right"|
|align="right"|unknown
 
|Co-operative Commonwealth Fed.
|Samuel Clayton Muirhead
|align="right"|3,470 	 		 	 	    
|align="right"|<31.06%
|align="right"|4,549      		
|align="right"|44.05%
|align="right"|
|align="right"|unknown

 
|Liberal
|Douglas T. Wetmore
|align="right"|2,899 	 		
|align="right"|25.95%
|align="right"| - 
|align="right"| -.- %
|align="right"|
|align="right"|unknown
|- bgcolor="white"
!align="right" colspan=3|Total valid votes
!align="right"|11,172 	  		 
!align="right"|100.00%
!align="right"|10,327  	  	
!align="right"| - %
!align="right"|
|- bgcolor="white"
!align="right" colspan=3|Total rejected ballots
!align="right"|614
!align="right"|
!align="right"|
!align="right"|
!align="right"|
|- bgcolor="white"
!align="right" colspan=3|Turnout
!align="right"|%
!align="right"|
!align="right"|
|- bgcolor="white"
!align="right" colspan=7|3  Preferential ballot.  First and final counts of three shown only.
|}

 
|Conservative
|Thomas Alexander McRae
|align="right"|252 		  	             	
|align="right"|2.48%
|align="right"|
|align="right"|unknown
 
|Co-operative Commonwealth Fed.
|Samuel Clayton Muirhead
|align="right"|	2,839 	 	
|align="right"|27.98%
|align="right"|
|align="right"|unknown

 
|Liberal
|William Thompson Waldie
|align="right"|1,960 	 	 	
|align="right"|19.31%
|align="right"|
|align="right"|unknown
|- bgcolor="white"
!align="right" colspan=3|Total valid votes
!align="right"|10,148
!align="right"|100.00%
!align="right"|
|- bgcolor="white"
!align="right" colspan=3|Total rejected ballots
!align="right"|70
!align="right"|
!align="right"|
|- bgcolor="white"
!align="right" colspan=3|Turnout
!align="right"|%
!align="right"|
!align="right"|
|}

 
|Co-operative Commonwealth Fed.
|Kenneth William Gaylor
|align="right"|2,536 	 	
|align="right"|23.31%
|align="right"|
|align="right"|unknown
 
|Liberal
|Michael Eugene Krause
|align="right"|2,034 		
|align="right"|18.69%
|align="right"|
|align="right"|unknown
 
|Progressive Conservative
|John Wilberforce Loader
|align="right"|608 		
|align="right"|5.59%
|align="right"|
|align="right"|unknown

|- bgcolor="white"
!align="right" colspan=3|Total valid votes
!align="right"|10,881
!align="right"|100.00%
!align="right"|
|- bgcolor="white"
!align="right" colspan=3|Total rejected ballots
!align="right"|81
!align="right"|
!align="right"|
|- bgcolor="white"
!align="right" colspan=3|Turnout
!align="right"|%
!align="right"|
!align="right"|
|} 	  	  	  	 

 
|Progressive Conservative
|Alan J.G. McCulloch
|align="right"|1,470 	 		
|align="right"|13.70%
|align="right"|
|align="right"|unknown
 
|Liberal
|John Basil Varcoe
|align="right"|1,139 	
|align="right"|10.62%
|align="right"|
|align="right"|unknown
|- bgcolor="white"
!align="right" colspan=3|Total valid votes
!align="right"|10,729 	
!align="right"|100.00%
!align="right"|
|- bgcolor="white"
!align="right" colspan=3|Total rejected ballots
!align="right"|53
!align="right"|
!align="right"|
|- bgcolor="white"
!align="right" colspan=3|Turnout
!align="right"|%
!align="right"|
!align="right"|
|}	  	

 
|Liberal
|Charles Samuel Fowler
|align="right"|1,960 		
|align="right"|19.57%
|align="right"|
|align="right"|unknown
|- bgcolor="white"
!align="right" colspan=3|Total valid votes
!align="right"|10,013 	
!align="right"|100.00%
!align="right"|
|- bgcolor="white"
!align="right" colspan=3|Total rejected ballots
!align="right"|49
!align="right"|
!align="right"|
|- bgcolor="white"
!align="right" colspan=3|Turnout
!align="right"|%
!align="right"|
!align="right"|
|}	  	

 
|Liberal
|Joseph Remesz
|align="right"|1,359 			
|align="right"|10.59%
|align="right"|
|align="right"|unknown
|- bgcolor="white"
!align="right" colspan=3|Total valid votes
!align="right"|12,835 	 	
!align="right"|100.00%
!align="right"|
|- bgcolor="white"
!align="right" colspan=3|Total rejected ballots
!align="right"|127
!align="right"|
!align="right"|
|- bgcolor="white"
!align="right" colspan=3|Turnout
!align="right"|%
!align="right"|
!align="right"|
|}	  	

 
|Liberal
|Colin Thomas Maddocks
|align="right"|1,541 				
|align="right"|10.99%
|align="right"|
|align="right"|unknown
|- bgcolor="white"
!align="right" colspan=3|Total valid votes
!align="right"|14,019 	 	 	
!align="right"|100.00%
!align="right"|
|- bgcolor="white"
!align="right" colspan=3|Total rejected ballots
!align="right"|92
!align="right"|
!align="right"|
|- bgcolor="white"
!align="right" colspan=3|Turnout
!align="right"|%
!align="right"|
!align="right"|
|}	  	

 
|Liberal
|Thomas George Milne
|align="right"|519 	 				
|align="right"|3.59%
|align="right"|
|align="right"|unknown
|- bgcolor="white"
!align="right" colspan=3|Total valid votes
!align="right"|14,455  	 	 	
!align="right"|100.00%
!align="right"|
|- bgcolor="white"
!align="right" colspan=3|Total rejected ballots
!align="right"|109
!align="right"|
!align="right"|
|- bgcolor="white"
!align="right" colspan=3|Turnout
!align="right"|%
!align="right"|
!align="right"|
|}	  	

 
|Progressive Conservative
|Dale Murray Brown
|align="right"|852 	 	 				
|align="right"|5.38%
|align="right"|
|align="right"|unknown
|- bgcolor="white"
!align="right" colspan=3|Total valid votes
!align="right"|15,832  	 	 	
!align="right"|100.00%
!align="right"|
|- bgcolor="white"
!align="right" colspan=3|Total rejected ballots
!align="right"|186
!align="right"|
!align="right"|
|- bgcolor="white"
!align="right" colspan=3|Turnout
!align="right"|%
!align="right"|
!align="right"|
|}	  	

 
|Liberal
|Sergio C. Cocchia
|align="right"|394 	 	 				
|align="right"|2.34%
|align="right"|
|align="right"|unknown

|Independent
|Frederick William James Peitasche
|align="right"|176 	 	 				
|align="right"|1.05%
|align="right"|
|align="right"|unknown

|- bgcolor="white"
!align="right" colspan=3|Total valid votes
!align="right"|16,812  	 	 	
!align="right"|100.00%
!align="right"|
|- bgcolor="white"
!align="right" colspan=3|Total rejected ballots
!align="right"|243
!align="right"|
!align="right"|
|- bgcolor="white"
!align="right" colspan=3|Turnout
!align="right"|%
!align="right"|
!align="right"|
|}	

 
|Liberal
|Thomas C. Esakin
|align="right"|476 		 	 				
|align="right"|2.95%
|align="right"|
|align="right"|unknown

|- bgcolor="white"
!align="right" colspan=3|Total valid votes
!align="right"|16,119 	 	 	
!align="right"|100.00%
!align="right"|
|- bgcolor="white"
!align="right" colspan=3|Total rejected ballots
!align="right"|179
!align="right"|
!align="right"|
|- bgcolor="white"
!align="right" colspan=3|Turnout
!align="right"|%
!align="right"|
!align="right"|
|}	

|Independent
|Christopher D'Arcy
|align="right"|3,802 	 	 	 	 		 	 	
|align="right"|23.58% 	
|align="right"|
|align="right"|unknown
|- bgcolor="white"
!align="right" colspan=3|Total valid votes
!align="right"|16,122 		 	 	
!align="right"|100.00%
!align="right"|
|- bgcolor="white"
!align="right" colspan=3|Total rejected ballots
!align="right"|337
!align="right"|
!align="right"|
|- bgcolor="white"
!align="right" colspan=3|Turnout
!align="right"|75.18%
!align="right"|
!align="right"|
|}	

 
|Liberal
|Jim Greene
|align="right"|5,923 	 		 	 	 		 	
|align="right"|34.80% 
|align="right"|
|align="right"|unknown

|Progressive Democratic Alliance
|Kathy Plummer
|align="right"|660 	 	 	 		 	 	
|align="right"|3.88% 	
|align="right"|
|align="right"|unknown
|- bgcolor="white"
!align="right" colspan=3|Total valid votes
!align="right"|17,018	 	 	
!align="right"|100.00%
!align="right"|
|- bgcolor="white"
!align="right" colspan=3|Total rejected ballots
!align="right"|67
!align="right"|
!align="right"|
|- bgcolor="white"
!align="right" colspan=3|Turnout
!align="right"|74.70%
!align="right"|
!align="right"|
|}	

The Rossland-Trail area was redistributed following the 1996 election.  The new riding representing the area at the 2001 election was West Kootenay-Boundary.

References 

Elections BC Historical Returns

Former provincial electoral districts of British Columbia